Dunkin is a surname. Notable people with the surname include:

 Christopher Dunkin, PC (1812–1881), Canadian editor, lawyer, teacher, judge, and politician
 Edwin Dunkin FRS, (1821–1898), British astronomer
 Kenneth Dunkin, (born 1966), Democratic member of the Illinois House of Representatives
 Robert Dunkin (1761–1831), mentor of the young Humphry Davy
 Tony Dunkin (born 1970), American basketball player
 William Dunkin (1709–1765), Irish poet

See also
Duncan (disambiguation)
Dunkin (disambiguation)